Botsvatn or Bossvatn is a lake in the municipality of Bykle in Agder county, Norway. The lake holds water for the Brokke Hydroelectric Power Station, located in nearby Valle municipality. The water from the lake can flow out into the nearby river Otra, but only when water is released from the dam.

The mountain Steinheii lies on the south shore of the lake and the mountain Strondefjell lies on the north side of the lake.

See also
List of lakes in Aust-Agder
List of lakes in Norway

References

Bykle
Lakes of Agder
Reservoirs in Norway